Valentina Visconti is the name of:

 Valentina Visconti, Duchess of Orléans (1371–1408)
 Valentina Visconti, Queen of Cyprus (c. 1357–before September 1393)